Maha-Sangram (also known in the UK as The Big Battle) is a 1990 Bollywood action romance film directed by Mukul Anand and starring Vinod Khanna, Aditya Pancholi, Govinda and Madhuri Dixit.

The film is best known for bringing Aditya Pancholi into the limelight as it was his show-stealing performance and his first commercial success in Bollywood. His performance as the angry villain Thakur was critically acclaimed and widely accepted, thus becoming the main reason of the movie's success.

Plot
Uttar Pradesh-based Vishal gets a telegram from Santa Cruz Police Station that his younger collegian brother, Arjun, is dead. Distraught he travels to Bombay, collects his brothers ashes, and finds out that Arjun met a violent death. With the aid of a street-smart con-woman and her mentor, Babu Kasai Hyderabadi, he then sets out to find who killed his brother - not knowing that soon he will be drawn into the dark world of Godha and Vishwaraj. The film also features Aditya Pancholi as Suraj also known as Chota Godha

Cast
Vinod Khanna as Vishal
Aditya Pancholi as Suraj aka Chota Godha
Madhuri Dixit as Jhumri   
Govinda as Arjun 
Shaheen as Pooja 
Gulshan Grover as Police Officer  
Shakti Kapoor as Babu Kasai Hyderabadi
Amjad Khan as Bada Godha
Sonu Walia as Neelam
Sumeet Saigal as Prakash
Kiran Kumar as Vishwa
Pradeep Rawat as Pakya
Shammi as Mary

Track list
The soundtrack was composed by Anand Milind. The item number "Dhak Dhak Dil Dhadke" features vocals by Alisha Chinai with a few lines rendered by Aditya Pancholi, who has acted in the movie. Lyrics were penned by Sameer

References

External links 
 

1990s Hindi-language films
1990 films
1990 romantic drama films
Films directed by Mukul S. Anand
Films scored by Anand–Milind
Indian romantic drama films